Alienosternus is a genus of beetles in the family Cerambycidae, containing the following species:

 Alienosternus cristatus (Zajciw, 1970)
 Alienosternus metallicus Martins, 1976
 Alienosternus simplex Martins, 1976
 Alienosternus solitarius (Gounelle, 1909)

References

Piezocerini